Dick Richardson may refer to:

Dick Richardson (boxer) (1934–1999), Welsh heavyweight boxer
Dick Richardson (cricketer) (born 1934), English Test cricketer
President Dick Richardson, a fictional character in the video game Fallout 2 who serves as the main antagonist

See also
Richard Richardson (disambiguation)